Mitjamba may refer to:

 Mitjamba people, or Mbara, an Aboriginal Australian people
 Mitjamba language, or Mbara, an extinct language of Australia

Language and nationality disambiguation pages